The Abandoned Baobab is a book written by Ken Bugul, which is actually a pseudonym for Mariètou Mbaye Biléoma. She was urged to publish this book under a pen name since the subject matter of the novel deals with things that are not traditionally considered appropriate in Senegal.  The book was originally published in French in 1982 as Le Baobab Fou and was translated in English in 1991, published by Lawrence Hill Books.

The book is written from the perspective of a Senegalese woman living in diaspora, named Ken Bugul, and the book is largely biographical. However, while the novel does reflect true events, it is not a completely authentic re-telling of those event. Bugul uses her own experiences to shape the narrative, but the story is not a chronological re-telling of the events. The book is crafted in a way that the reader can understand a clear narrative and understand the effects of post-colonialism on a young Senegalese woman living in diaspora.

The review in Publishers Weekly characterised The Abandoned Baobab as "a wise, stirring, fresh and lyrical account, superbly translated," that "describes the pain and confusion of growing up in a West African country where residual French colonial influences disrupt her family life and make her feel a stranger among her own people." 

The novel begins and ends with the baobab tree, which is of great symbolic importance in the novel.  Of Bugul's use of the baobab tree, Shirin Edwin writes:

Notes

1982 novels
French-language novels
Senegalese novels